Felipe Orts Lloret (born 1 April 1995) is a Spanish road and cyclo-cross cyclist, who currently rides for UCI ProTeam  in road racing, and UCI Cyclo-cross team Teika–BH–GSport in cyclo-cross. He finished second at the men's under-23 event at the 2017 UCI Cyclo-cross World Championships.

For the 2021 road racing season, Orts joined the  team on a one-year contract; he remained with Teika–BH–GSport in cyclo-cross events.

Major results

Cyclo-cross

2012–2013
 1st  National Junior Championships
2014–2015
 2nd National Under-23 Championships
 2nd Valencia
2015–2016
 1st  National Under-23 Championships
 1st Les Franqueses del Valles
 1st Valencia
2016–2017
 1st  National Under-23 Championships
 2nd  UCI World Under-23 Championships
2017–2018
 1st Overall Copa de España
1st Laudio
1st Elorrio
 1st Manlleu
 1st Valencia
 1st Abadino
 1st Utsunomiya
 2nd National Championships
 2nd Les Franqueses del Valles
2018–2019
 1st  National Championships
 1st Overall Copa de España
1st Laudio
2nd Elorrio
2nd Karrantza
 1st Marin-Pontevedra
 1st Vic
 1st Abadino
 1st Ametzaga Zuia
 Utsunomiya
1st Day 2
2nd Day 1
 3rd Manlleu
2019–2020
 1st  National Championships
 Copa de España
1st Laudio
1st Elorrio
 1st Vic
 1st Manlleu
 1st Les Franqueses del Valles
 2nd Overall EKZ CrossTour
2nd Aigle
 3rd Waterloo
 3rd Iowa City
 3rd Woerden
2020–2021
 1st  National Championships
 1st Overall Copa de España
1st Sueca
1st Xàtiva
1st Valencia
 EKZ CrossTour
3rd Bern
2021–2022
 1st  National Championships
 1st Contern
 1st Marin-Pontevedra
 1st Elorrio
 1st Xàtiva
 Ethias Cross
3rd Leuven
 Copa de España
3rd Pontevedra
2022–2023
 1st  National Championships
 Copa de España
1st Xativa
2nd Pontevedra
 1st As Pontes de Garcia Rodriguez
 2nd Ardooie
 2nd Sanxenxo
 3rd Marín

References

External links

1995 births
Living people
Cyclo-cross cyclists
Spanish male cyclists
Place of birth missing (living people)
People from Villajoyosa
Sportspeople from the Province of Alicante
Cyclists from the Valencian Community